Forsayth is a rural town and locality in the Shire of Etheridge, Queensland, Australia.

Geography

The town is the terminus of the Etheridge Railway.

History
Jangga, also known as Yangga, is a language of Central Queensland. The Jangga language region includes the landscape within the local government boundaries of the Etheridge Shire Council.

Originally known as Finnigan's Camp after the prospector who discovered gold nearby in 1871, within a year the settlement had become Charleston township, and it continued to grow despite near desertion when its inhabitants rushed to the Palmer River Goldfield in 1874 and to the Hodgkinson in 1876. Charleston Post Office opened on 1 February 1876, was renamed Charleston West in 1910 and closed in 1915. After a slump in the mid-1880s the township was again a flourishing centre by the mid-1890s, having five hotels, a school and a court of petty sessions.

Charleston Provisional School  opened on 4 March 1895. On 1 January 1909 it became Charleston State School a. In 1920 it was renamed Forsayth State School. 

By the late 1890s base metal prices were high: a number of promising copper deposits were opened up in the Etheridge district at Charleston, Einasleigh and Ortona, and several were acquired by a subsidiary of the Chillagoe Company. This led the company to commence a rail link in 1907 from Almaden to Einasleigh and the Charleston area, which was completed in January 1910. The Etheridge Railway terminated at a new settlement on the other side of the Delaney River. First known as New Charleston, it was renamed Forsayth after the railways commissioner, James Forsyth Thallon. During the year, all the buildings in Charleston, including the police station and the school, which had previously been at Gilberton, were moved across the Delaney River to Forsayth.

The second Charleston Post Office opened here by April 1910 and was renamed Forsayth in December 1910. New buildings and services followed the opening of the railway; these included a hospital, a new court house and a new school built in 1912, and a public hall built two years later.

In 1914 the Chillagoe smelters were shut down and the town's importance as an ore-loading facility and centre for miners and their families declined as mining activity in the area was scaled back.

Queensland Railways took the railway line over in 1918.

Forsayth remained the railhead for transport to the west, although plans in the 1930s to extend the railway to connect to the Normanton-Croydon railway did not proceed. From the 1980s, renewed mining activity in the area and increased livestock traffic revived the town.

Heritage listings 
Forsayth has a number of heritage-listed sites, including:
 Fourth Street: Station Master's Residence
Etheridge railway line: Forsayth railway station

Economy 
Forsayth is a service centre for road transport and regional tourism.

Amenities 
The Forsayth branch of the Queensland Country Women's Association has its QCWA Hall in Fourth Street.

St Augustine of Canterbury Church is shared by the Anglican and Catholic communities. It is on the corner of Third and Fourth Streets. It is within the Gulf Savannah Parish of the Roman Catholic Diocese of Cairns.

Education 
Forsayth State School is a government primary (Early Childhood-6) school for boys and girls at Third Street. In 2014, the school had an enrolment of 8 students with 2 teachers. In 2018, the school had an enrolment of 9 students with 2 teachers and 4 non-teaching staff (2 full-time equivalent).

Attractions 
Forsayth is now serviced by a weekly, privately operated, tourist train, The Savannahlander.

References

Further reading

External links

University of Queensland: Queensland Places: Forsayth
Town map, 1977

Towns in Queensland
Populated places in Far North Queensland
Shire of Etheridge
Localities in Queensland